Beta Love is the third studio album of the Syracuse-based indie rock band Ra Ra Riot. It is the first album since the departure of founding member/cellist, Alexandra Lawn, who left the band in 2012. Band members have stated that the album is directly influenced by sci-fi author William Gibson and inventor-futurist Ray Kurzweil.

Track listing

Videos
 "Beta Love": Directed and Edited by David Dean Burkhart
 "Dance With Me": Directed by Christopher Mills
 "Binary Mind": Directed by Cole Hannan

Personnel

Ra Ra Riot
Wes Miles - vocals, keyboards
Mathieu Santos - bass
Milo Bonacci - guitar, keyboards
Rebecca Zeller - violin

Additional Personnel
Will Cole - engineering 
Dennis Herring - mixing, production
Drew Vandenberg - engineering, mixing
Howie Weinberg - mastering engineer

References

External links
Official website
MySpace website
Barsuk Records

Ra Ra Riot albums
2013 albums
Albums produced by Dennis Herring